Never Say Goodbye is a Philippine television drama broadcast on TV5. It aired from February 11 to May 10, 2013.

Cast and characters

Main cast
 Vin Abrenica as William Carpio
 Sophie Albert as Kate Montecastro

Supporting cast
 Nora Aunor as Marta Marasigan-Carpio
 Alice Dixson as Criselda Madrigal-Montecastro
 Cesar Montano as Javier Montecastro
 Gardo Versoza as Dindo Carpio
 Rita Avila as Glenda Maglungsod / Greta Pendelton
 Megan Young as Vera Maglungsod / Pendelton
 Edgar Allan Guzman as Troy Mendez

Reucrring cast
 Raquel Villavicencio as Yaya Maring
 Lander Vera-Perez as Joseph Mendez
 Malak So Shdifat as Valerie
 Alvin Anson as Ramil
 Benjo Leoncio as Miko
 Brent Manzano as Brix
 Chris Leonardo as Noli
 Angeli Bayani as Clara
 AJ Dee as Steve
 Jervi Li as Mama Melo

Special participation
 Eula Caballero as the young Marta Marasigan *
 Charee Pineda as the young Criselda Madrigal *
 Alwyn Uytingco as the young Dindo Carpio *
 Martin Escudero as the young Javier Montecastro *

Guest appearances
 Marvelous Alejo as the young Glenda Maglungsod / Greta Pendelton *

(*) Seen on flashback parts

Trivia
 This series is a reunion project with some of the cast members, including: Gardo Versoza and Cesar Montano (Jose Rizal), Gardo and Nora Aunor (Bituin), Cesar and Nora (El Presidente), Alice Dixson and Mac Alejandre (Panday 2), Cesar, Mac, Vin Abrenica, Sophie Albert, Marvelous Alejo, Benjo Leoncio, Brent Manzano and Chris Leonardo (Artista Academy), Gardo, AJ, and Mac (Amaya).
 This is also Megan Young's first project for TV5. She has been an ABS-CBN contract star, while her sister Lauren made another TV project with Mundo Mo'y Akin in GMA-7.
 Jose Rizal stars Gardo Versoza and Cesar Montano are return to GMA to appear between Gardo for Mga Basang Sisiw and Cesar for Akin Pa Rin ang Bukas individually.

See also
List of programs broadcast by TV5

References

External links
 

Philippine drama television series
2013 Philippine television series debuts
2013 Philippine television series endings
TV5 (Philippine TV network) drama series
Philippine action television series
Philippine melodrama television series
Espionage television series
Filipino-language television shows